Osvaldo Gerico (born 1 May 1914, date of death unknown) was a Brazilian footballer. He played in five matches for the Brazil national football team in 1942. He was also part of Brazil's squad for the 1942 South American Championship.

References

External links
 

1914 births
Year of death missing
Brazilian footballers
Brazil international footballers
Association football defenders
São Cristóvão de Futebol e Regatas players
CR Flamengo footballers
CR Vasco da Gama players
Sociedade Esportiva Palmeiras players